The Lair of the White Worm is a horror novel by the Irish writer Bram Stoker. It was first published by Rider and Son of London in 1911 – the year before Stoker's death – with colour illustrations by Pamela Colman Smith. The story is based on the legend of the Lambton Worm. It has also been issued as The Garden of Evil.

The book is widely considered one of the worst books ever written.

Plot summary

The central character of the book is Adam Salton, an Australian at the outset living there, who in 1860 is contacted by his elderly great-uncle, Richard Salton, a landed gentleman of Lesser Hill, Derbyshire, England, who has no other family and wants to establish a relationship with the only other living member of the Salton family. Although Adam has already made his own fortune in Australia, he enthusiastically agrees to meet his uncle, and on his arrival by ship at Southampton the two men quickly become good friends. His great-uncle then reveals that he wishes to make Adam the heir to his estate, Lesser Hill. Adam travels there and quickly finds himself at the center of mysterious events, with Sir Nathaniel de Salis, a friend of Richard Salton's, as his guide.

Edgar Caswall, the new heir to a neighboring estate, Castra Regis or Royal Camp, is in the process of making a mesmeric assault on a local girl, Lilla Watford. Meanwhile, Arabella March, of Diana's Grove, is running a game of her own, perhaps angling to become Mrs. Edgar Caswall. He is a slightly pathological eccentric and has inherited Franz Mesmer's chest, which he keeps in the Castra Regis Tower. Caswall seeks to make use of mesmerism, a precursor to hypnotism, and, obsessed with Lilla, attempts to break her using mesmeric powers. However, with the help of Lilla's half-Burmese cousin, Mimi Watford, he is thwarted time and again.

Caswall has a giant kite built in the shape of a hawk to scare away pigeons that have attacked his fields and destroyed his crops. For lack of anything better to do, he obsessively watches the kite and begins to believe that it has a mind of its own and that he himself is a god.

Adam Salton finds black snakes on his great uncle's property and buys a mongoose to hunt them down. He then discovers a child who has been bitten on the neck and who almost dies as a result. Adam learns that another child has already been killed by a snake bite and that animals have also been killed mysteriously throughout the county.

Caswall's Black African servant, Oolanga, a man obsessed with death and torture, prowls around the Castra Regis estate, enjoying the carnage left by the White Worm. Adam's mongoose attacks Arabella, who shoots it to death. Adam buys more mongooses and keeps them locked in trunks when not using them to hunt. Arabella tears another mongoose apart with her hands. Oolanga takes a liking to Arabella, perhaps sensing something violent in her, and makes advances. Arabella scorns Oolanga and is deeply insulted that he would dare to approach her. In an attempt to win her over, Oolanga steals one of Adam's trunks (which he believes is filled with treasure, but is actually just another mongoose), and Adam follows Oolanga. Arabella lures Oolanga to a deep well in her house, then in rage and disgust murders him by dragging him down into the deep pit tunneled through a bed of white china clay. Adam witnesses the murder, but has no evidence of it apart from his own word. Arabella writes him a letter the next day, with the previous night's events twisted, claiming her complete innocence. Adam and Sir Nathaniel begin to suspect that Arabella is guilty of other crimes and that she wants to murder Mimi Watford.

Adam and Sir Nathaniel then plot to stop Arabella by whatever means necessary. Sir Nathaniel is a Van Helsing-type character who wants to hunt down Arabella, who he believes, with increasing conviction, is the White Worm of legend.

The White Worm is a large snake-like creature dwelling deep under Arabella's house at Diana's Grove. It has green glowing eyes and feeds on whatever living creatures it can find to eat. Sir Nathaniel believes the Worm is descended from dragons, who traded their physical power for cunning. The Worm ascends from its pit and seeks to attack Adam and Mimi Watford in the forest of Diana's Grove.

Adam is able to foil Arabella's multiple attempts to murder Mimi, and Arabella offers to sell Diana's Grove, which Adam buys with the aim of destroying the White Worm. He plans to fill the pit with sand and set dynamite to kill the Worm while it is underground.

Caswall's last visit to Lilla ends in her death. In the final chapters, Mimi Watford confronts Caswall who has finally succumbed to madness. He lures her onto the roof of Castra Regis House as a storm approaches and shows off his kite, despite the thunderheads building in the sky. Arabella, who had been stalking Mimi, watches from nearby and steals some of the wire holding the kite, apparently unspooling it all the way back to her house. When Mimi discovers Caswall has locked her onto the roof she shoots off the lock with a gun Adam gave her for her protection and flees home. Adam convinces her to go back outside with him, and they witness the following events: a massive thunderstorm breaks over Castra Regis House, a lightning bolt is grounded by the kite and demolishes the Castra Regis tower; it then travels through the wire Arabella had run to Diana's Grove and ignites Adam's dynamite, which pulverizes the White Worm and destroys the house and Arabella at the same time. After this, Adam and Mimi Watford are married.

Reception
Les Daniels noted that while The Lair of the White Worm had "potential", it was undermined by the "clumsy style" of the writing. The horror critic R. S. Hadji placed The Lair of the White Worm at number twelve in his list of the worst horror novels ever written. Historian of the horror genre H. P. Lovecraft, in his essay "Supernatural Horror in Literature", stated that Stoker "utterly ruins a magnificent idea by a development almost infantile."

Adaptations and popular culture
In 1925 a highly abridged and rewritten form was published by Foulsham. It was shortened by more than 100 pages, the rewritten book having only 28 chapters instead of the original 40. The final eleven chapters were cut down to only five, leading some critics to complain that the ending was abrupt and inconsistent.
The Lair of the White Worm was very loosely adapted by Ken Russell into a 1988 film of the same name.
The first episode of the German radio drama "Die schwarze Sonne", produced by the label LAUSCH, is loosely based on the events of The Lair of the White Worm. The main characters of the radio drama are also based on the protagonists of the novel and feature in the rest of the episodes even though the plot turns away from Stoker's original story.
The White Worm makes an appearance in one optional encounter in Jonathan Green's ACE gamebook Dracula: Curse of the Vampire, where it has taken possession of the body of Count Dracula.

References

External links

 
 The Lair of the White Worm (ebook) – full text of the 1911 edition
 Illustrations by Pamela Colman Smith – all six illustrations of the 1911 edition
 

1911 British novels
1911 fantasy novels
20th-century Irish novels
British horror novels
Fiction set in 1860
Fictional worms
Irish novels adapted into films
Novels adapted into radio programs
Novels by Bram Stoker
Novels set in Derbyshire